The Multi Media Interface (MMI) system is an in-car user interface media system developed by Audi, and was launched at the 2001 Frankfurt Motor Show on the Audi Avantissimo concept car. Production MMI was introduced in the second generation Audi A8 D3 in late 2002 and implemented in majority of its latest series of automobiles.

Concept
MMI consists of a single integrated interface, which controls a variety of devices and functions of the car. The system consists of the MMI terminal and the MMI display screen.

The central element of the MMI terminal is the control dial. This dial can be rotated, to navigate up and down through menus, and pressed to activate a selected highlighted function. Starting with MMI 3G system an integrated joystick in the main control dial can be used to (for example) navigate the map. Depending on the MMI generation and configuration, four to eight function buttons surround the control dial which are used to launch the various features. The MMI screen is available as a five-inch monochrome black-and-red or seven-inch 16:9 full colour display, depending on the variation of MMI fitted in the car. MMI uses Media Oriented Systems Transport (MOST) technology to interconnect the various systems. Harman Becker Automotive Systems manufactures the MMI system, utilizing QNX Neutrino's Real Time Operating System (RTOS) software.

Functions
MMI operates a large number of in car entertainment components, car electronics, and other functions. The list below indicates the scope of systems controllable by MMI. However, depending on the actual car model, along with which version was specified (MMI Basic, MMI High, etc.), only some, and not all functions will be applicable or available.
 Satellite navigation, including traffic management (TMC)
 Radio tuner
 Media sources (CD changer, Audi Music Interface, aux audio port, TV tuner, two external AV sources)
 Telephone and directory
 Heating, ventilation, air conditioning, climate control, and seat heating
 Car setup (e.g. central locking and convenience function (coming home/leaving home, power sunroof and windows) options, global audio settings, suspension settings, interior lighting, Audi Side Assist settings etc.)
 Rear view camera and parking sensors
 Driver information (e.g. fuel economy statistics (often encompassed by "trip computer" functions), battery level, oil level, tire-pressure monitoring, etc.)
 User manual (full on-board car user manual, displayed on screen)
 Apple CarPlay and Android Auto for 2014 and later model.

Cars
Audi models for which MMI is available:

MMI Generation RNS-E 

Certain cars have a "pseudo" type of MMI. These are the Audi A3 (8P), A4 (B6 and B7), A6 (C5), TT (8J), the R8, SEAT Exeo and Lamborghini Gallardo - when fitted with the RNS-E DVD based "Audi Navigation Plus" system. Whilst appearing to be a similar layout, and operating in a similar manner, these two systems are very different, are unable to share mapping discs or software, and are not able to control non-ICE functions (such as climate, convenience or suspension settings).

On members of the B8 family of vehicles (the A4 (Typ 8K), A5 (Typ 8T), and Q5 (Typ 8R)) without full navigation capability, Audi does not describe this infotainment system as MMI, although an MMI-esque control dial and function keys is provided on the radio/CD head unit.

MMI Generations 2G through 3G+
The MMI system has been improved over the years and now features internet connectivity through MMI Connect introduced in recent models.

Issues
While seemingly intuitive and user-friendly, MMI can be difficult to operate when driving. Attempts have been made to improve access: the MMI 3G features a new Joystick on the central knob to make it easier to for example input a destination using the navigation map. However, the issues remain. The Audi Q5's MMI infotainment control system is especially difficult to navigate, partly due to the location of its controls low down on the center console.

Software updates
MMI 3G and 3G+ systems have to be updated by an Audi dealer. The MMI 2G firmware can be updated by car owners. 
 MMI 2G systems can be updated via a CD containing the firmware update. Navigation maps are read in real time from DVD drive located in the trunk.
 MMI 3G and 3G+ systems can be updated by using a SD Card/USB/CD/DVD containing the software. The total update process can take approximately 1 hour and 45 minutes. Once the updated software is applied it requires a PIN to re-activate the navigation system.
 To enter the MMI software update menu, the [Setup] and [Return] buttons have to be pressed simultaneously for 5 seconds. This menu also enables import/export settings to USB or SD Card, the settings are saved as an AES encrypted zip file. 
Software version format varies by MMI system type:
 MMI 2G: SW: XX-XX XX.X.X XXXX
 MMI 3G Basic: BNAV_XX_XXXXX
 MMI 3G High: HNAV_XX_XXXXX
 MMI 3G+: HN+_XX_XXXXX [A1 A4 A5 Q5 Q7]  HN+R_XX_XXXXX [A6 A7 A8 Q3]
 MMI RMC: RMC_XX_XXXXX
 MMI MIB1: MHIG_XX_XXXX
 MMI MIB2: MHI2_XX_XXXX
 MMI MSTD: MSTD_XX_XXXX
 MMI MIB3: MHI3_XX_XXX
MMI 2G software version history

MMI 3G and 3G+ MMI software version history

All 3G systems are on HDD; P=Shipped with car; K=Installed by Update

BBT seems to be for Basic without Navigation, BNav for 3G Basic, HNav for 3G High, HN+/HN+R for 3GPlus

MMI 3G and 3G+ navigation database versions

Partial list of MMI firmware updates [by Part Number] for 3G Basic, 3G High and 3G Plus:

Modular Infotainment Matrix (MIB)

Background 
Modular Infotainment Matrix (MIB) is a new architecture intended to solve a challenge that is becoming increasingly urgent – innovations in consumer electronics and rapid gains in computing power are being introduced at speeds that are much faster than the product cycles of automotive manufacturers.

The central computer in the modular infotainment platform, housed in the glove box, comprises two main units in a single housing – the Radio Car Control Unit and the MMX (Multi-Media eXtension) board. Along with its working and flash memories, the plug-in module integrates a Tegra processor from Nvidia, which can handle all online, media, voice control, navigation, and telephone functions. The new architecture makes it easy to update the hardware; the fact that the MMX board can be swapped out ensures the system is always up to date.

2012 saw the debut of the Modular Infotainment Matrix (MIB) with an NVIDIA T 20 chip as its heart in the Audi A3. One-and-a-half years later, the MIB's second stage has been deployed in the Audi TT and in the new Audi A6 and A7 Sportback. The T 30 is a quad-core chip running a 3D graphic program from specialist software manufacturer Rightware to render graphics on two displays simultaneously. Thanks to the matrix’ modular structure, Audi can keep it continuously up-to-date and integrate innovations from consumer electronics.
Another chip from NVIDIA, the Tegra 4, powers the Audi tablet debuting in the new Q7. With a 10.1‑inch display, the Audi tablets will provide mobile rear-seat entertainment. In the car, the special purpose tablet will connect itself to the on-board infotainment and navigation system via WLAN and can also be used on a WLAN outside the car.

MIB / MIB II 
The new MIB navigation system is the first system that allows the customer to update the vehicle's navigation system on their own. The map data is available on the myAudi website for download or available in the MMI via an OTA update. For the 2015-2016 Audi A3 with MIB1, there is no OTA option in the MMI, thus the map data can only be updated using the SD card method.

For MIB1 & MIB2 vehicles, map updates are free for the first three years after the production date of the vehicle. The vehicle is automatically activated from the factory to allow the customer to update the MMI navigation with the next five releases within the next three years. This means the customer can attempt to update the MMI with the same release as many times as they want. Release schedules for map updates are approximately Calendar Week 22 (May/June) and Calendar Week 45(October/November) of each year.

Software version history

MIB 3 
The 2021 Model Year is expected to include the Generation 3 infotainment technologies. This includes a digital marketplace in the myAudi app to add Audi Connect plans and SiriusXM with 360L.

See also
 Audi Navigation Plus
 Modular infotainment platform
 Global Navigation Satellite System

References

External links
 Audi A6 '05 SSP 326 Shows all MMI Module Locations and Specs and Blueprints
 Audi A6 '05 SSP 323 Shows all Mechanical and Electrical Module Locations and Specs
 Audi USA MMI Information
 Audi MMI emulator 
 Audi navigation and electronics sub-forum Independent forum dedicated to Audi Navigation systems
 Audi RNS-E FAQ Independent blog dedicated to Audi Navigation systems
 Audi list of Navigation parts
 Audi Navigation Microsite

Advanced driver assistance systems
Audi
Automotive technology tradenames
Human–computer interaction
In-car entertainment
Vehicle telematics